The Farmington Tithing Office, at 110 N. Main St. in Farmington, Utah, was built during 1907–1909.  It was listed on the National Register of Historic Places in 1985.

It is significant, according to a 1984 Utah State Historical Society review, "as one of 32 well preserved tithing buildings in Utah that were part of the successful "in-kind" tithing system of The Church of Jesus Christ of Latter-day Saints (LDS church) between the 1850s and about 1910."

Formerly used as Farmington's town hall, the building now houses the Farmington Historical Museum.

References

Tithing buildings of the Church of Jesus Christ of Latter-day Saints
1909 establishments in Utah
Properties of religious function on the National Register of Historic Places in Utah
Victorian architecture in Utah
Buildings and structures completed in 1909
Tithing Office
National Register of Historic Places in Davis County, Utah